Ourselves is a 1988 album by hardcore punk band 7 Seconds.

Critical reception
Trouser Press called Ourselves "state of the art: intelligent lyrics of personal and political consequence, moderately powerful singing, buzzing guitars and brisk tempos." Spin called it "fun, fast and smart—a pleasant alternative to mall-born pop slush and three-time losers retreading Dolls riffs."

Track listing 
All songs written by Kevin Seconds, except where noted.
 "Escape and Run" - 2:52
 "Far Away Friends" (Seconds, Steve Youth) - 2:41
 "Save Ourselves" - 3:07 
 "If I Abide" - 3:23
 "Wish I Could Help" - 2:27
 "Sleep" (Youth) - 3:35
 "Sister" - 2:04
 "Middleground" - 4:28
 "When One Falls" (Seconds, Youth) - 3:30
 "Some Sort of Balance" (Seconds, Youth) - 2:49
 "Seven Years" (Seconds, Youth, Troy Mowat) - 4:06

Personnel

Kevin Seconds: Lead Vocals 
Bob Adams: Guitar, Vocals 
Troy Mowat: Drums 
Steve Youth: Bass, Piano

References

1988 albums
7 Seconds (band) albums